Obed Isai Rincon Lopez (born 4 February 1985 in Monterrey, Nuevo Leon, Mexico, is a former professional footballer, who last played as a left back for C.F. La Piedad in the Ascenso MX. He started his professional career with club Necaxa in 2008.

References
 

1985 births
Living people
Footballers from Nuevo León
Sportspeople from Monterrey
Association football defenders
Indios de Ciudad Juárez footballers
Club Puebla players
La Piedad footballers
Correcaminos UAT footballers
Club Necaxa footballers
Salamanca F.C. footballers
Mexican footballers